Inoke Afeaki (born 12 July 1973 in Tofoa, Tongatapu) is a Tongan former rugby union footballer, coach and administrator. He has played professionally in New Zealand, Japan, Wales, France and Tonga, and coached in France, New Zealand and Singapore. His usual playing position was at lock.

Career
Afeaki has played for the Wellington Lions in the National Provincial Championship, the Hurricanes in the international Super 14 competition, Secom and Ricoh in Japan before joining the Scarlets in Wales.  He represented Grenoble in the French Pro D2. He captained Tonga at the 2003 Rugby World Cup. He signed for Saint Etienne in 2009.

In 1986-90, he attended St Bernard's College in Wellington,  in 1991 and 1992 he played for the Wellington under 19 and 21 teams respectively. He played for Petone from 1992 through to 1999, and the Wellington Lions from 1993–96 and again from 1999-01. He made his Super 12 debut for the Hurricanes  in 1996, in the first season. He played in Japan from 1997–98, then returned to the Hurricanes from 1999 to 2001. He went back to Japan in 2002 and played there until 2005.

International career
He made his debut for Tonga on May 26, 1995 in a match against France, coming on as a replacement in Pretoria during the 1995 Rugby World Cup. He also played in two other matches during the tournament, in the starting line-up, against Scotland and Côte d'Ivoire.

He next played for Tonga in November 2001 when he started against Scotland at Murrayfield Stadium. He captained them in their next match against Wales, in which he scored a try. He retained the captaincy for the following season and played four matches for Tonga in 2002. Following captaining them in a number of internationals in 2003, he then led Tonga at the 2003 Rugby World Cup in Australia. In 2004 he was the captain of the Pacific Islanders rugby union team that played a series of matches against southern nations. In an incident during the match against Côte d’Ivoire he tackled Max Brito, an ivoirian player, who was seriously injured and remain paralyzed ever since.

Afeaki was coach and technical director at Singapore Rugby Union from 2012 to 2017, before taking sports administration positions in Tonga.

Personal life 
Afeaki's family moved from Tonga to Petone when he was three. He now lives in Wellington and works as a site logistics controller for construction company McKee Fehl.

Afeaki is married to Kanoko, who is Japanese. The couple has two sons. He became a New Zealand citizen in 2022 and is contesting election to the Wellington City Council.

References

External links
 Inoke Afeaki on teivovo.com

1973 births
Living people
Rugby union locks
Tongan rugby union players
Scarlets players
Black Rams Tokyo players
Wellington rugby union players
Hurricanes (rugby union) players
FC Grenoble players
People from Tongatapu
Tonga international rugby union players
Pacific Islanders rugby union players
Tongan expatriate rugby union players
Expatriate rugby union players in France
Expatriate rugby union players in New Zealand
Expatriate rugby union players in Japan
Tongan expatriate sportspeople in Japan
Tongan expatriate sportspeople in France
Tongan expatriate sportspeople in New Zealand
People educated at St Bernard's College, Lower Hutt